Dmitry Yuryevich Maryanov (1 December 1969 — 15 October 2017) was a Soviet and Russian theater and film actor, TV presenter.

Filmography 
 1986 — Higher Than Rainbow as Alik Raduga
 1988 — Dear Yelena Sergeyevna as Pasha
 1991 — Love as Vadim
 1996 — What a Wonderful Game as Lev
 1997 — Snake Spring
 1999 — The President and His Granddaughter
 2002 — Theatrical Novel as Foma Strizh
 2005 — The Fall of the Empire as Bredel
 2008 — Radio Day as DJ Dim
 2014 — Heavenly Court as Krasavets

References

External links 
 

1969 births
2017 deaths
Male actors from Moscow
Soviet male film actors
Soviet male television actors
20th-century Russian male actors
21st-century Russian male actors
Russian male film actors
Russian male television actors
Russian male stage actors
Soviet male stage actors
Russian television presenters
Soviet male child actors